Bourciera is a genus of neotropical terrestrial gastropod mollusks  or land snails  in the family Helicinidae. All species in the genus have an operculum. 

In 1907, an attempt was made to rename the genus Pseudhelicina, sometimes corrected to Pseudohelicina, on the basis of the fact that Bourciera was also the name of a genus of birds, but according to MolluscaBase this replacement was unnecessary and Bourciera is still used. H. Burrington Baker considered Bourciera among the most primitive of terrestrial mollusks.

Distribution 
The genus was initially described from Ecuador based on specimens collected by Jules Bourcier, after whom it was named. It is also known to occur in Peru.

Species 
Species within the genus Bourciera include:
 Bourciera fraseri Pfeiffer 1859
 Bourciera helicinaeformis Pfeiffer 1853
 Bourciera striatula Miller 1879
 Bourciera viridissima Miller 1879

References 

Helicinidae
Taxa named by Ludwig Karl Georg Pfeiffer
Gastropod genera